Cryptochloris is a genus of golden moles, containing the two species De Winton's golden mole (Cryptochloris wintoni) and Van Zyl's golden mole (Cryptochloris zyli).

References

Afrosoricida
Mammal genera
Taxonomy articles created by Polbot